Pelopidas lyelli, the Lyell's swift, is a butterfly of the family Hesperiidae. It is found in New South Wales, the Northern Territory, Queensland and Western Australia, as well as Irian Jaya, Maluku, Papua New Guinea, the Solomon Islands and Vanuatu.

The wingspan is about 30 mm.

The larvae feed on the leaves of various Poaceae species, including Sorghum bicolor, Panicum maximum, Pennisetum pedicellatum, Oryza sativa and Paspalum dilatatum. It creates a shelter by rolling a leaf of the host plant. It hides in this shelter during the day and emerges at night to feed. Pupation takes place inside this shelter.

External links
Australian Insects
Australian Faunal Directory

Pelopidas (skipper)
Butterflies described in 1915